The 200th Pennsylvania Volunteer Infantry was an infantry regiment that served in the Union Army during the American Civil War.

Service
The 200th Pennsylvania Infantry was organized at Harrisburg, Pennsylvania on September 3, 1864 and mustered in under the command of Colonel Charles Worth Diven.

The regiment was attached to Engineer Brigade, Army of the Potomac, to October 1864. Provisional Brigade, Army of the James, to November 1864. Provisional Brigade, IX Corps, Army of the Potomac, to December 1864. 1st Brigade, 3rd Division, IX Corps, to May 1865.

The 200th Pennsylvania Infantry mustered out of service on May 20, 1865. Recruits whose term of service had not expired were transferred to the 51st Pennsylvania Infantry.

Detailed service
Left Pennsylvania for Bermuda Hundred, Va., September 9. Duty near Dutch Gap, Va., with the Army of the James September 11 to November 28, 1864. Repulse of attack November 19. Transferred to the Army of the Potomac November 28. Siege of Petersburg December 1864 to April 1865. Dabney's Mills, Hatcher's Run, February 5-7, 1865. Fort Stedman March 25. Appomattox Campaign March 28-April 9. Assault on and capture of Petersburg April 2. Occupation of Petersburg April 3. Pursuit of Lee April 3-9. Appomattox Court House April 9. Surrender of Lee and his army. Duty at Nottaway Court House until May. Ordered to City Point, then to Alexandria and duty there until May 30.

Casualties
The regiment lost a total of 54 men during service; 30 enlisted men killed or mortally wounded, 24 enlisted men died of disease.

Commanders
 Colonel Charles Worth Diven
 Colonel William H. H. McCall

See also

 List of Pennsylvania Civil War Units
 Pennsylvania in the Civil War

References
 Dyer, Frederick H. A Compendium of the War of the Rebellion (Des Moines, IA: Dyer Pub. Co.), 1908.
Attribution
 

Military units and formations established in 1864
Military units and formations disestablished in 1865
200